David Tsimakuridze (29 March 1925 – 9 May 2006) was a Georgian middleweight freestyle wrestler. He won an Olympic gold medal in 1952, becoming the first Olympic champion from Georgia. Domestically he won the Soviet title in freestyle (1945–1947, 1949–1952) and Greco-Roman wrestling (1947 and 1948). After retiring from competitions he worked as a coach, and prepared the national team for the 1956 Olympics.

References

1925 births
2006 deaths
Burials at Mtatsminda Pantheon
People from Poti
Soviet male sport wrestlers
Male sport wrestlers from Georgia (country)
Olympic wrestlers of the Soviet Union
Wrestlers at the 1952 Summer Olympics
Olympic gold medalists for the Soviet Union
Olympic medalists in wrestling
Medalists at the 1952 Summer Olympics
Honoured Masters of Sport of the USSR
Communist Party of the Soviet Union members